Amed or AMED may refer to:

Amed (Bali), a town in Bali, Indonesia
Amedisys Home Health and Hospice Care, a home health and hospice care company in the US, NASDAQ abbreviation AMED
 Japan Agency for Medical Research and Development
Amed Ber, a town in northern Ethiopia
Amed Davy Sylla, Russian footballer

See also
Diyarbakır, a Kurdish city in Turkey, known to Kurds as Amed